Agustín Fuentes is an American primatologist and biological anthropologist at Princeton University and formerly the chair of the Department of Anthropology at the University of Notre Dame. His work focuses largely on human and non-human primate interaction, pathogen transfer, communication, cooperation, and human social evolution.

Education and career
Fuentes was born on July 30, 1966 in Santa Barbara, California and graduated from University of California, Berkeley with a B.A. in Anthropology and Zoology, as well as an M.A. and PhD in Anthropology. He has since been researching fields of biological anthropology and primatology, exploring the entanglement of biological systems with the social and cultural dimensions. He began his academic career at Central Washington University and most recently served at the University of Notre Dame in a number of different roles, including Director of the Institute for Scholarship in the Liberal Arts as well as Professor and Chair of the Department of Anthropology. Beginning in Fall 2020, he serves as Professor in the Department of Anthropology at Princeton University.

Fuentes was elected as a member of the American Academy of Arts and Sciences in 2020.

Work
One of Dr. Fuentes' major impacts on the field of primatology has been his work on human and non-human primate interactions. He has worked extensively with populations of macaques in Bali and Gibraltar, where the monkeys are a large tourist attraction, focusing on the spread of diseases between humans and macaques.

He has also done extensive work in the area of human social evolution, particularly relating to the neurological aspects. Dr. Fuentes believes that increased social complexity was necessary for our interaction with the environment and within our own social groups. It is this increased complexity along with primate biology and a changing environment that he believes is responsible for the success of humans in terms of expansion beyond the limits of most animal species.

Select publications

Books

A. Fuentes. 2019 Why We Believe: Evolution and the Human Way of Being. Yale University Press. 
A. Fuentes. 2017 The Creative Spark: How Imagination Made Humans Exceptional. Dutton (Penguin Random House). 
A. Fuentes. 2012 Race, Monogamy and Other Lies They Told You: Busting myths about human behavior. University of California Press. 
C. Campbell, A. Fuentes, K. MacKinnon, S. Bearder, R. Stumpf P. Dolhinow, A. Fuentes, eds. 2010. The Nonhuman Primates. 2d ed. Oxford: Oxford University Press. 
A. Fuentes. 2008. Evolution of Human Behavior. Oxford: Oxford University Press. 
C. Panter-Brick, A. Fuentes, eds. 2008. Health, Risk and Adversity. New York/Oxford: Berghahn Books 
A. Fuentes. 2006. Core Concepts in Biological Anthropology. New York: McGraw-Hill. 
A. Fuentes, L.D. Wolfe. 2002. Primates Face to Face: The Conservation Implications of Human-nonhuman Primate Interconnections. Cambridge: Cambridge University Press. 
P. Dolhinow, A. Fuentes. 1999. The Nonhuman Primates. New York: McGraw-Hill.

Articles
A. Fuentes, S. Kalchik, L. Gettler, A. Kwiatt, M. Konecki, L. Jones-Engel. 2008. "Characterizing Human–Macaque Interactions in Singapore". American Journal of Primatology 70(9):879-883. . . .
D.L. Cohn, V. Smith, M. Pizarro, L. Jones-Engel, G. Engel, A. Fuentes, E. Shaw, J. Cortes. "Pediculosis in Macaca sylvanus of Gibraltar". Veterinary Parasitology 145(1/2):116-119. . . .
A. Fuentes. 2006. "Human Culture and Monkey Behavior: Assessing the Contexts of Potential Pathogen Transmission between Macaques and Humans". American Journal of Primatology 68(9):880-896. . .
A. Fuentes. 2004. "It's Not All Sex and Violence: Integrated Anthropology and the Role of Cooperation and Social Complexity in Human Evolution". American Anthropologist 106(4):710-718. . .
A. Fuentes. 2013. Evolutionary Perspectives and Transdisciplinary Intersections. A Roadmap to Generative Areas of Overlap in Discussing the Human Nature. Theology and Science 11(2):106–129. .

References

External links
Agustín Fuentes at University of Notre Dame 

American anthropologists
Primatologists
Living people
Year of birth missing (living people)
University of Notre Dame faculty
University of California, Berkeley alumni
People from Santa Barbara, California